Angelo Pichi or Angelo Pico (died 12 December 1653) was a Roman Catholic prelate who served as Archbishop (Personal Title) of San Miniato (1648–1653)
and Archbishop of Amalfi (1638–1648).

Biography
On 10 November 1638, Angelo Pichi was appointed during the papacy of Pope Urban VIII as Archbishop of Amalfi.
On 14 November 1638, he was consecrated bishop by Giovanni Battista Maria Pallotta, Cardinal-Priest of San Silvestro in Capite, with Alfonso Gonzaga, Titular Archbishop of Rhodus, and Tommaso Carafa, Bishop Emeritus of Vulturara e Montecorvino, serving as co-consecrators. 
On 23 November 1648, he was appointed during the papacy of Pope Innocent X as Archbishop (Personal Title) of San Miniato.
He served as Bishop of San Miniato until his death on 12 December 1653.

While bishop, he was the principal co-consecrator of Isidoro della Robbia, Bishop of Bertinoro (1642).

See also 
Catholic Church in Italy

References

External links and additional sources
 (for Chronology of Bishops) 
 (for Chronology of Bishops)  
 (for Chronology of Bishops) 
 (for Chronology of Bishops)  

Year of birth missing
1653 deaths
17th-century Italian Roman Catholic archbishops
Bishops appointed by Pope Urban VIII
Bishops appointed by Pope Innocent X